The Karatau or Qaratau is a mountain range located in southern Kazakhstan. 

The name Karatau means Black Mountain in the Kazakh language. The mountains have deposits of phosphorite, lead and zinc.

Geography
The Muyunkum Desert lies to the north of the range. The Karatau is the westernmost prolongation of the Tian Shan. The summits of the mountains are smooth and the slopes are cut by snow-fed rivers. The Shabakty, Kyrshabakty, Ushbas, Bugun and Asa, are among the rivers having their sources in the range.

World Heritage Status 
There are numerous ancient archaeological sites in the range that display the stages of cultural evolution from the early Paleolithic Age (1 million BP) to the Neolithic Age (6500 BP). This site was added to the UNESCO World Heritage Tentative List on September 24, 1998 in the Cultural category.

Nature Reserve
The Karatau Nature Reserve is a protected area in the range established in 2004.

References

External links
 

Mountain ranges of Kazakhstan
World Heritage Tentative List
Mountain ranges of the Tian Shan